The 1993 Kazakhstan Premier League was the second season of the Top Division, now called the Kazakhstan Premier League, the highest football league competition in Kazakhstan.

Teams
Metallist, Arman and CSKA Almaty were all relegated to the Kazakhstan First Division at the end of last season. Karachaganak, Namys Almaty, Dinamo Almaty, Dostyk and Metallist were all promoted to the Kazakhstan Premier League for the first time.

Before the start of the season, Arsenal-SKIF became SKIF-Ordabasy, Aktau became Munaishy, Uralets became Uralets-Arma, Montazhnik became Yassi, Zhetysu became Taldykorgan, Traktor became Ansat, Ekibastuzets became Batyr and Zenit Kokshetau became Azhar Kokshetau.

League format
Originally planned 26 teams in total. But like the season earlier, one team withdrew during the season. This time it was FC Kokshetau. All its games were annulled. The competition was split into two stages. In first stage two groups of 12 and 13 teams were formed.  In second stage the best six teams of each group joined together to play in a final group for positions 1 to 12. The rest of the teams played in a group for positions 13 to 25. Teams played against each other on home-away basis in their groups. Final standings of teams did not count the results of the first stage.

First round

Group A

League table

Results

Group B

League table

Results

Second round

Championship round

League table

Results

Relegation round

League table

Results

Statistics

Top scorers

References

External links
 Lyakhov.kz 1993 Season

Kazakhstan Premier League seasons
1993 in Kazakhstani football
Kazakh
Kazakh